James Joseph McGuinness (2 October 1925 – 6 April 2007) served as the eighth Roman Catholic Bishop of Nottingham from 1974 to 2000.

He was born in Derry City, Northern Ireland, he was educated at St. Columbs College, Derry, and the seminaries at Carlow College, and St. Mary's, Oscott . He was ordained priest on 3 June 1950, aged 24, for the Diocese of Nottingham by Bishop Edward Ellis.

On 2 February 1972, McGuinness was appointed Coadjutor Bishop of Nottingham and Titular Bishop of Sanctus Germanus by Pope Paul VI. He received his episcopal consecration on the following 23 March. On 31 October 1974, he succeeded to become Bishop of Nottingham, where he remained until his retirement in 2000.

He died on 6 April 2007, aged 81.

External links
 Bishop James Joseph McGuinness biodata
Obituary

1925 births
2007 deaths
Roman Catholics from Northern Ireland
Clergy from Derry (city)
Alumni of Carlow College
Alumni of St Mary's College, Oscott
20th-century Roman Catholic bishops in England
Roman Catholic bishops of Nottingham